Ironpot is a rural locality in the Livingstone Shire, Queensland, Australia.

History 

Road infrastructure
The Rockhampton-Yeppoon Road (as Yeppoon Road) runs through from south-west to north.

References 

Shire of Livingstone
Localities in Queensland